The Best Little Girl in the World is a 1981 television film directed by Sam O'Steen and executive produced by Aaron Spelling. The film is based upon the 1979 novel of the same name written by Steven Levenkron.

Plot
Seventeen-year-old Casey Powell is a shy teenaged cheerleader who gets good grades and dreams of being a professional ballet dancer. Her parents, Frank and Joanne, give all their attention to her 19-year-old sister Gail, who has just found out she is pregnant by someone she has no interest in marrying. Frank is infuriated and Joanne is worried, so they forget to spend time with Casey; not a new thing, as problem-child Gail has always drawn attention away from good-girl Casey. Feeling ignored by her parents and embarrassed by harassment at her cheerleading audition, Casey starts wanting to look like the models on the covers of magazines and begins to diet and exercise.

Casey is noticed by her ballet teacher, Madame Seuart, who tells her that she could be very good if she loses a few pounds. It doesn't take long before Casey becomes anorexic and bulimic. Casey's parents ignore her dream of becoming a professional dancer and instead want her to graduate high school, get a good job, and then become a wife and mother. Over the next two months, Casey's illness progresses as she throws herself into dieting and ballet dancing which causes Gail to worry that something is wrong with her. Her grades in school begin to deteriorate, which finally draws her parents' attention; however, Gail's attempts to support Casey cause more fights with their parents and distracts them from Casey.

When Gail sees how thin Casey has become, she is horrified and warns her parents. Casey is sent to a doctor who orders her to start eating normally again, threatening to send her to a hospital if she doesn't. Despite the pressure, Casey continues her eating disorder in secret. Frank finds her diet pills and tries to force her to eat, but she refuses. After feeling ignored at a party, Casey lies to her parents about having eaten at the party. Frank doesn't believe her and tries to force feed her a peanut butter sandwich, but Casey bites his hand. In an attempt to mend things with her family, Casey makes her family breakfast and even eats it with them, but is discouraged when she finds out that her mother has decided to go to her sister's lamaze class and shop for baby supplies instead. Because her parents took away her diet pills and laxatives, Casey attempts to steal more from the pharmacy the next day; however, she is caught and arrested. Her parents bail her out, but she collapses outside of the police station and is taken to the hospital. She tries to run away, but collapses in the attempt and is re-captured.

In the hospital, Casey befriends fellow patient Carol Link, who is also suffering from anorexia and bulimia. Carol gives Casey advice about how to be kicked out of the hospital and teaches her tricks to mislead the doctors. However, Casey later watches Carol's death from a pill overdose. Crushed and devastated, she runs away again but collapses for the third time. When she regains consciousness, Casey is angry that she's back in the hospital. In a turning point, she tells her doctor, Clay Orlovsky, that she is afraid to die as well; he assures her that she won't, but only if she starts being honest with him and makes a genuine effort to recover.

When Casey improves, she is finally allowed to see her family again; Dr. Orlovsky watches and analyzes their reunion. Gail and Frank argue, Joanne acts as peacemaker, and Casey sits in a corner and stays out of the way. Dr. Olovsky tells the family that he thinks Casey developed her eating disorder because she felt ignored and neglected by her family and she viewed it as the only way for her to get their attention. Despite being a delight - good grades, good student, polite, pretty, dedicated, and an excellent dancer - Casey has been ignored and sidelined in favor of Gail. Her personality forces her to strive for perfection in everything, including her appearance, and she seeks control in her diet because she feels out of control in the rest of her life.

After a while, Casey begins to recover and is released from the hospital. She doesn't want to leave, however, and feels safer with Dr. Orlovsky than with her family. In the final scene, she is able to enjoy eating ice cream.

Cast
(in credits order)

 Charles Durning as Frank Powell
 Eva Marie Saint as Joanne Powell
 Jennifer Jason Leigh as Casey Powell
 Melanie Mayron as Carol Link
 Lisa Pelikan as Gail Powell
 Viveca Lindfors as Madame Seurat
 David Spielberg as Dr. Garett
 Jason Miller as Clay Orlovsky
 Richard Venture as Dr. Neil Holzer
 Lenora May as Julie
 Laurence Lau as Mark
 Michael Dudikoff as Chuck
 Stephanie Cockington as Mary
 Ally Sheedy as First Girl
 Andrea Pope as Michelle
 Richard Milholland as Dr. Norman
 Jonathan Estrin as Dr. Shuster
 Lang Yun as Nurse Prine
 Pat Corley as Store Manager
 Enid Kent as First Nurse
 Gwen Van Dam as Nurse
 Ruth Silveira as Second Nurse
 Marilyn Coleman as Emergency Nurse
 Paul Laurence as Respiratory Therapist
 Helen Hunt as a friend of Casey
 Jessica Lange

Production
Producer Aaron Spelling came to the idea of making a movie about the book. Jennifer Jason Leigh replaced Jodie Foster, who was at one point assigned to play the lead. Leigh weighed 98 pounds at the time, but dieted down to 86 pounds to play the role.
Actors Jason Miller and Charles Durning were close friends; Durning's career making performance was in Miller's 1973 Pulitzer Prize winning play That Championship Season.

Reception
The film's reception was generally positive; in particular, Leigh was praised for her portrayal of a teenager. The film gained attention again in 1983, when singer/drummer Karen Carpenter died of complications from anorexia nervosa. Although the film was later released on VHS, the movie is now quite rare.

The movie, however, received criticism for its portrayal of treatment for anorexia victims, which was thought to be unrealistic. Another criticism was that its plot differed too much from the novel.

References

External links

1981 television films
1981 films
ABC network original films
American television films
Films scored by Billy Goldenberg
Films about eating disorders
Films based on American novels
Television shows about body image
Films directed by Sam O'Steen
1980s English-language films